St. John's Protestant Episcopal Church is an historic church located at 628 Main Street in Stamford, Connecticut. The church is an English Gothic Revival structure, built in 1891 to a design by William Potter. It has buttressed stone construction, with a compound-arch entry and a large rose stained-glass window. The associated parish house, also a Gothic Victorian structure, was designed by Richard M. Upjohn and built in 1869–72.

Rectors
The position of rector of St. John's Church has been in effect since 1748.

 Ebeneezer Dibblee 1748-1799
 Jonathan Judd 1812-1822
 Ambrose Seymour Todd 1823-1861
 Walter Mitchell 1861-1866
 William Tatlock 1866-1896
 Charles Morris Addison 1897-1919
 Gerald A. Cunningham 1920-1942
 Stanley F. Hemsley 1942-1974
 Douglas E. Theuner 1974-1986
 Leander Harding 1989-2005
 James R. Wheeler 2007–2019

See also
St. Luke's Chapel
National Register of Historic Places listings in Stamford, Connecticut

References

External links
Church website

Churches on the National Register of Historic Places in Connecticut
Queen Anne architecture in Connecticut
Gothic Revival church buildings in Connecticut
Episcopal church buildings in Connecticut
Churches completed in 1891
19th-century Episcopal church buildings
Churches in Stamford, Connecticut
Richard Michell Upjohn church buildings
National Register of Historic Places in Fairfield County, Connecticut
1748 establishments in Connecticut